Azubu was a live streaming esports website. In May 2017, it shut down and was succeeded by Smashcast.

History 
Azubu was founded in 2012 when Lars Windhorst noticed that children were using live streaming services to watch others play video games, with the biggest game being League of Legends. Windhorst claimed "it was exotic" to witness people watch others play video games. Over a four-year span, Sapinda Group, the firm that Windhorst owned, invested $40 million USD into Azubu.

In 2014, Azubu announced partnered with fourteen League of Legends streamers including Faker of SKT T1 K and MadLife of CJ Entus Frost.

Throughout much of 2016, several employees left the company, leaving Sapinda Group to fund Azubu less and less. Windhorst eventually admitted that he had funded Azubu inefficiently and should have provided more sufficient funding. Sapinda Group would "drip-feed" funds to Azubu to accelerate growth.

In April 2016 Azubu revealed that they had been developing a better video player and a revenue network that they released for their website. The same year, Esportspedia, owned by Azubu, moved to EsportsWikis, although the old website is still functional.

Closure 
In January 2017, Azubu revealed that they were no longer able to stream League of Legends due to a $2 million price hike in streaming rights. The same month, Azubu announced that they had acquired  and were working on develop a new eSports platform.

On May 9, 2017, Hitbox shut down, with the new release of the Azubu team and the Hitbox team's new platform Smashcast.

Azubu allegedly haven't paid out the prizes for several esports events. The current CEO, Mike McGarvey, explained the reason as "Azubu’s previous management team made commitments to broadcasters and events far beyond the company’s means".

References 

Video game websites
Video hosting
Former video hosting services
Internet television channels
Mass media companies established in 2012
Internet properties disestablished in 2017
Video game streaming services